Dermatobranchus rubidus is a species of sea slug, a nudibranch, a marine gastropod mollusc in the family Arminidae.

Distribution
This species occurs in the Indo-Pacific region. It was described from Hawaii. It has subsequently been reported from New Zealand where it was described as Dermatobranchus pulcherrimus Miller & Willan, 1986.

References

Arminidae
Gastropods described in 1852